Natalya Leonidova Ignatova (born 28 December 1973) is a Russian sprinter. She competed in the women's 100 metres at the 2000 Summer Olympics.

References

External links
 

1973 births
Living people
Place of birth missing (living people)
Russian female sprinters
Olympic female sprinters
Olympic athletes of Russia
Athletes (track and field) at the 2000 Summer Olympics
World Athletics Championships athletes for Russia
Russian Athletics Championships winners
Universiade medalists in athletics (track and field)
Universiade silver medalists for Russia